Trail in Life is the second studio album by Canadian country music artist Dean Brody. It was released on August 17, 2010 via Open Road Recordings under the production of Matt Rovey. The album includes the singles "Wildflower," "Roll That Barrel Out," "Trail in Life," "People Know You by Your First Name" and "Little Yellow Blanket."

Background
"My life's been kind of a trail - it hasn't been one spot for 30 years - it's been a bunch of different places, different memories and different friends. It's about time passing and reminiscing," Mr. Brody is quoted as saying of the album. "Songs about driving, good old times, good old days and growing up."

Track listing

Chart performance

Singles

References

External links
[ Train in Life] at Allmusic

2010 albums
Dean Brody albums
Open Road Recordings albums
Canadian Country Music Association Album of the Year albums